{{DISPLAYTITLE:C10H12O2}}
The molecular formula C10H12O2 (molar mass : 164.2 g/mol, exact mass: 164.08373 u) may refer to:

 Chavibetol
 3,4-Dimethoxystyrene
 Duroquinone
 Eugenol, a phenylpropene
 Isoeugenol, a phenylpropene
 Phenethyl acetate
 Propyl benzoate
 Pseudoisoeugenol
 Raspberry ketone
 Thujaplicins
 α-Thujaplicin
 β-Thujaplicin (hinokitiol)
 γ-Thujaplicin
 Thymoquinone